Grand Rabbi Baruch Yehoshua Yerachmiel Rabinovich (1914–1997), was a member of a chassidic dynasty, and succeeded to the title Munkacser Rebbe.

Early years 
Boruch Yehoshua Yerachmiel was born in Russia in 1914 to his parents, Rabbi Nosson Dovid Rabinovich (1868–1930), the Partzever Rebbe, and Yitta Spira. His father was the eldest son of Rabbi Yitzchak Yaakov of Biala (1847–1905). His mother was the daughter of Rabbi Moshe Leib Spira of Stryzow (1850–1916), of the Munkacs dynasty. He was engaged to his intended bride at the age of 11. When he was 13, his father-in-law-to-be, Rabbi Chaim Elazar Spira of Munkacs, took him on a visit to the Holy Land.

Marriage 

In 1933 Rabinowicz married Frima Chaya Rivka, the only daughter of his mother's first cousin, Rabbi Chaim Elazar Spira (1872–1937), Munkacser Rebbe and Chief Rabbi of Munkacs, also known as the 'Minchas Elazar'. This union set him on course to succeed his father-in-law as rabbi and 'Admor' of Munkacs. His wedding in 1933 was attended by 20-30,000 guests. Film of the wedding is on the web site of the United States Holocaust Memorial Museum, and is on display at the Museum of Jewish Heritage in New York City.

Rabbi of Munkacs
Rabbi Boruch's became rav and rebbe of Munkacs in 1937 following the death of his father-in-law. At the beginning of World War II he was deported to Poland but released soon afterwards and moved with his family to Budapest, where he to obtained visas and escaped to Palestine, where his wife died in April 1945.

Post-war 
In 1946, Rabinowicz tried to become the Chief Rabbi of Tel Aviv, but withdrew from the race. In 1947, he moved to São Paulo, Brazil. He had become sympathetic to Zionism and the State of Israel, unlike his father-in-law. The Munkatcher chasidim who had survived the war put his son Moshe Leib, the current Munkatcher Rebbe, in his place.

Rabinowicz returned to Israel in 1963 to become Chief Rabbi of Holon. He later moved to Petah Tikva where he headed a small Beis Hamedrash until his death in 1997. His second son, Chaim Rabinovich, lived in Jerusalem after spending most of his life in Vienna and South America, and died in 2013. His third son, Rabbi Moshe Leib Rabinovich, is the Rebbe of Munkacs and resides in Brooklyn, New York. His fourth son, Rabbi Yizchok Yakov Rabinovich is the Rebbe of Dinov and also resides in Brooklyn. 

In 1996, Rabinowicz published his works Divrei Nevonim and Binat Nevonim.

See also
Munkacs (Hasidic dynasty)

References

External links
 Wedding in Munkacs 

1914 births
1997 deaths
Haredi Zionists
Rebbes of Munkacs
Hasidic rabbis in Europe
Rabinovich, Baruch
Rabinovich, Baruch
Rabinovich, Baruch
Chief rabbis of cities in Israel
Holocaust survivors
Hungarian emigrants to Mandatory Palestine
Burials at Segula Cemetery